The 1908 Currie Cup was the ninth edition of the Currie Cup, the premier domestic rugby union competition in South Africa.

See also

 Currie Cup

References

1908
1908 in South African rugby union
Currie